Abdulaziz bin Majid Al Saud (born 1960) is the former governor of Madinah Province and a member of House of Saud.

Early life and education
Prince Abdulaziz was born in 1960. He is Majid bin Abdulaziz's second son. Abdulaziz's mother is Nuf bint Abdallah Al Fahd Al Muhanna. He is the full brother of Prince Mishaal, and he also has five sisters. One of his sisters, Jawaher bint Majid, is the first Saudi woman to have been granted the title of the patron of arts in Saudi Arabia. Another, Basma bint Majid, married Bandar bin Faisal, one of King Faisal's sons.

Prince Abdulaziz is a graduate of King Fahd University of Petroleum and Minerals.

Career
Abdulaziz bin Majid is former deputy governor of Al-Qassim Province where the governor was Faisal bin Bandar. His tenure lasted until October 2005. When then-governor of Madinah Province Muqrin bin Abdulaziz was appointed as head of the General Intelligence Presidency, Abdulaziz bin Majid replaced him in the post in October 2005. His term was extended for four years in 2009.

Prince Abdulaziz's term ended on 14 January 2013, and he was replaced by Prince Faisal bin Salman.

Other positions
Abdulaziz bin Majid was vice chairman of the Majid Society until 2018 that was founded by his father in 1998 for charitable purposes.

Personal life
Abdulaziz bin Majid is married to Princess Nuha, the daughter of Prince Saud bin Abdul Muhsin Al Saud. He has three sons and one daughter: Saud, Omar, Abdullah and Lolowah. He also wed Haifa bint Fahd bin Turki bin Ahmed Al Sudairi who is the mother of Saud.

References

External links

21st-century Saudi Arabian politicians
1960 births
Abdulaziz
King Fahd University of Petroleum and Minerals alumni
Living people
Abdulaziz
Abdulaziz